James Robert Morrison, known as Jim Bob, is a British musician and author. He was the singer of indie punk band Carter the Unstoppable Sex Machine.

Biography

Jim Bob played in various bands during the late 1970s and early 1980s, including Jamie Wednesday, who were performing between 1984 and 1987. In 1987 Jamie Wednesday split up just before a gig at the London Astoria. Morrison and Les "Fruitbat" Carter filled in, playing along to a backing tape, and Carter USM was born. Jim Bob and Les Carter had known each other since the late 1970s, when their bands The Ballpoints (featuring Jim on vocals) and Dead Clergy (Les on bass and vocals) used to rehearse at the same studio behind Streatham station. When The Ballpoints' bassist quit at the end of 1980, Carter joined the band, who than went on to play several gigs under the name Peter Pan's Playground.

He was a member of Carter USM. The band split up in 1997. Since Carter USM, Jim Bob has released two albums and three singles with his disco-pop-punk group Jim's Super Stereoworld, seven solo albums as Jim Bob or James Robert Morrison, and played various live shows both with his band and solo.  In 2001, he joined his old Carter bandmate Fruitbat on stage once again, as part of the group Who's The Daddy Now?.

In 2005, Cherry Red released a DVD of a live solo acoustic performance, titled Live From London, featuring songs from his solo career as well as many Carter USM tracks. This was followed by a concept album, School, released in March 2006.

A best-of album was released in the autumn of 2006, accompanied by a UK tour. This was originally intended as a download-only release, but a physical CD was produced. The album was accompanied by a free CD of Jim Bob and Jim's Super Stereoworld rarities. The cover design was re-worked by Jim Bob from an image by Jim Connolly.

The album A Humpty Dumpty Thing was released in November 2007 by Cherry Red Records. The album came with a Jim Bob-penned-mini novel, "Word Count". A single from the album, "Battling The Bottle", was released with Jim Bob's re-working of the children's song "The Wheels on the Bus" on the B-side.

Jim Bob's next solo record, Goffam, was a semi-concept album about a city in the grip of crime, deserted by its superheroes. He toured the UK in April and September 2009 promoting the album.

In December 2009 Jim Bob performed his 2004 song "Angelstrike!" as part of the shows The Return of 9 Lessons and Carols for Godless People for two nights at the Bloomsbury Theatre and at Hammersmith Apollo. This was broadcast on BBC4 television under the title 'Nerdstack'.

His debut novel Storage Stories was released  on the day of a UK general election, 6 May 2010, by Ten Forty Books. This was followed by three novels with major publishers: Driving Jarvis Ham, The Extra Ordinary Life of Frank Derrick, Age 81 and Frank Derrick's Holiday of a Lifetime.

Jim Bob's autobiography, Goodnight Jim Bob – On The Road With Carter The Unstoppable Sex Machine, was published by Cherry Red Books in 2004. The sequel, Jim Bob from Carter, was published by Cherry Red Books on 23 March 2019. The double novel A Godawful Small Affair and Harvey King Unboxes His Family, written under the name J.B. Morrison, was published by Cherry Red Books in March 2020.

The 26-second song "2020 WTF!" was released in March 2020 on Cherry Red Records. It was the first single from Jim Bob's August 2020 album, Pop Up Jim Bob. The second single, "Jo's Got Papercuts", followed in June, and a third, "If it Ain't Broke", was released in July.

The album Pop Up Jim Bob was released on Cherry Red Records on 14 August 2020. Entering the official UK album chart at number 26, it was Jim Bob's first top-30 LP since Carter The Unstoppable Sex Machine.

Jim Bob's 13th solo album, Who Do We Hate Today, was released on Cherry Red Records on 20 August 2021 and reached 34 in the UK album charts, his second top-40 solo LP.

Solo discography
All releases credited as Jim Bob unless otherwise stated. See Carter USM and Jamie Wednesday for those bands' discographies.

Albums
 Jim's Super Stereoworld, 2001 (Jim's Super Stereoworld)
 JR, 2001 (James Robert Morrison)
 Big Flash Car on a Saturday Night, 2002 (Jim's Super Stereoworld)
 Goodnight Jim Bob, 2003
 Angelstrike!, 2004
 School, 2006
 Best of Jim Bob, 2006
 A Humpty Dumpty Thing, November 2007
 Goffam, April 2009
 What I Think About When I Think About You, November 2013
 Jim Bob Sings Again, November 2016
 Pop Up Jim Bob, August 2020 
 Who Do We Hate Today, August 2021
 The Essential Jim Bob, November 2022

Singles
 Jim's Super Stereoworld – "Bonkers in the Nut", 1999
 Jim's Super Stereoworld – "Could U B The 1 I Waited 4", 1999
 Jim's Super Stereoworld – "Bubblegum EP", 2002
"Dumb and Dumber", March 2005
"Battling The Bottle (Fighting The Flab, At War with the World)", November 2007
"The Man Behind the Counter of the Science Fiction Superstore", Marc 2009
"Our Heroes", June 2009
"Dream Come True", September 2013
"Breaking News", October 2013
"2020 WTF!", April 2020

Other releases
Acoustic Party 7
A Free CD recorded by Morrison at home and given away to the first 10 people to visit the T-shirt stall and ask for Marc or Neil on the October 2003 tour

Stolen from Westlife
25 readers of Morrison's book won a copy of the CD 'Stolen From Westlife' – 8 cover versions recorded by Morrison – after answering some questions posed by the author on page 95.

Busker
A free CD recorded by Morrison and containing six acoustic covers, the CD is currently being issued only to members of Morrison's "street team". The CD includes a cover of a track originally written and recorded by his former Carter bandmate Les Carter.

DVDs
Live From London, 2005
A DVD featuring a live acoustic performance of Jim Bob songs and Carter USM songs.  Bonus features include an interview with Morrison, Morrison reading excerpts from his autobiography and the video for the Jim's Super Stereoworld song "Bubblegum".
NATIONAL TREASURE – Live at the Shepherd’s Bush Empire , July 2019

Bibliography
Non-fiction
Goodnight Jim Bob (2006) – On the Road With Carter The Unstoppable Sex Machine Jim Bob's autobiographic tale of his time on tour with Carter USM. Published by Cherry Red Books.
Jim Bob from Carter: In the Shadow of my Former Self (2019) Published by Cherry Red Books

Fiction
Storage Stories (2010) – Jim Bob's debut novel, which took six years to write. described as a darkly comic rollercoaster ride full of thrills, spills and warm sick on the back of the neck.  Published by 1040 Books.
Driving Jarvis Ham (2012) – Jim Bob's second novel, following the life of the awkward character of Jarvis Ham, from the perspective of his oldest friend. A brilliantly witty story of unconventional, unwavering, and regularly exasperating friendship. Published by The Friday Club/HarperCollins 
The Extra Ordinary Life of Frank Derrick, Age 81 (June 2014) – Under the name J.B. Morrison. Published by Pan Macmillan. 
Frank Derrick's Holiday Of A Lifetime (2015) Published by Pan Macmillan
A Godawful Small Affair b/w Harvey King Unboxes His Family (2020) – Under the name J.B. Morrison. Published by Cherry Red Books

References

External links
Carter USM family
Jim Bob
Interview with Jim Bob in TRM bsarg

Carter the Unstoppable Sex Machine
1960 births
Living people
English male singers
English male guitarists
Musicians from London